Noa Noëll Lang (born 17 June 1999) is a Dutch professional footballer who plays as a winger for Belgian Pro League club Club Brugge and the Netherlands national team.

Club career

Ajax
On 1 December 2019, Lang became the first Ajax player to score a hat-trick on his first league start in 60 years as Ajax came from two goals down to beat Twente 5–2. Later that month, Lang scored his first goal in the KNVB Cup for Ajax, netting the opening goal in a 4–3 away win over Telstar in the second round.

In January 2020, following Ajax's signing of Ryan Babel in Lang's position, he was loaned out to fellow Eredivisie side Twente for the remainder of the season.

Club Brugge

2020–21 season: Loan and league title
On 5 October 2020, Ajax and Club Brugge reached a transfer agreement for Lang to move to Brugge on an initial loan with an obligation to make the signing permanent by 1 July 2021. Three weeks later, he scored his first goal for the club from the penalty-spot in a losing effort against OH Leuven. Lang scored in Club Brugge's 3–0 victory over Zenit Saint Petersburg in their penultimate UEFA Champions League group stage match on 2 December to keep alive Club Brugge's hopes of qualifying for the knock-out round. However, Club Brugge could only manage a 2–2 draw in the final match against Italian side Lazio and were parachuted down to the Europa League for the Round of 32.

On 28 January 2021, in his first appearance in a Bruges derby against Cercle, Lang scored the winning goal as Club Brugge came back from 1–0 down to win 1–2.

On 20 May, Lang scored as Brugge drew 3–3 with rivals Anderlecht to win the Belgian First Division A title for the fourth time in six years and 17th time overall. Lang was involved in 28 goal contributions during his first campaign with Club Brugge, scoring 17 goals and adding a further 11 assists.

2021–22 season
On 17 July 2021, Lang scored in Club Brugge's 3–2 win over Genk in the Belgian Super Cup. On 15 September, he earned the player of the match award in a 1–1 draw against Paris Saint-Germain in the UEFA Champions League.

International career
Born in the Netherlands, Lang is of Surinamese descent through his biological father. He is a youth international for the Netherlands.  Lang considers himself Dutch, Surinamese and Moroccan but can't internationally represent the latter due to not having Moroccan citizenship.

He made his debut for the Netherlands national football team on 8 October 2021 in a World Cup qualifier against Latvia.

On 11 November 2022, Lang was selected to represent The Netherlands at the 2022 FIFA World Cup.

Personal life
Lang was born in the Netherlands. His father is Surinamese, while his mother is Dutch. He was raised by his stepfather, Moroccan international footballer Nourdin Boukhari.

Controversy 
In May 2021, a video circulated online showing Lang joining an anti-Semitic chant of the Club Brugge supporters aimed at rival Anderlecht, who is seen as historically linked to the Jewish community. He was investigated by the Royal Belgian Football Association. While ignoring calls to apologize, Noa Lang justified his chantings with supporters as "a nickname" claiming that "racism and prejudice are well known to me [...] I didn’t want to offend anyone with that. I’m done with the subject and won’t be revisiting it." Noa Lang, who played with AFC Ajax, before joining Club Brugge, was defended by the team's organisation claiming that "there was no anti-Semitic undertone". The Club Brugge fans have been noticed by the press for racist chants.

The RBFA condemned his behavior, the Belgian Foreign Minister Sophie Wilmès declared : "Unacceptable, unbearable and it has no place in our society. We must fight it as vigorously as all other forms of racism", politicial parties condemned the chant, while he was obliged by the Federal prosecutor's office to visit the Kazern Dossin Centre as a disciplinary measure.

Career statistics

Club

International

Netherlands score listed first, score column indicates score after each Lang goal

Honours
Jong Ajax
 Eerste Divisie: 2017–18

Ajax
 Eredivisie: 2018–19
 KNVB Cup: 2018–19
 Johan Cruyff Shield: 2019

Club Brugge
 Belgian First Division A: 2020–21, 2021–22
 Belgian Super Cup: 2021, 2022

Individual
 Belgian Young Professional Footballer of the Year: 2020–21

References

External links

Profile at the Club Brugge K.V. website
Profile at the Royal Dutch Football Association website (in Dutch)

1999 births
Living people
People from Capelle aan den IJssel
Footballers from South Holland
Dutch footballers
Association football wingers
Jong Ajax players
AFC Ajax players
FC Twente players
Club Brugge KV players
Eerste Divisie players
Eredivisie players
Belgian Pro League players
Netherlands youth international footballers
Netherlands under-21 international footballers
Netherlands international footballers
2022 FIFA World Cup players
Dutch expatriate footballers
Expatriate footballers in Belgium
Dutch expatriate sportspeople in Belgium
Dutch sportspeople of Surinamese descent